Simpson is an unincorporated community in Taylor County, West Virginia, United States. It is the hometown of Randal McCloy, sole survivor of the 2006 Sago Mine disaster at Sago in Upshur County.

Simpson is located east of Flemington along the Right Fork Simpson Creek on County Route 13 in proximity to Tygart Lake State Park. Simpson also has its own post office, established in 1885  and currently in operation. The community takes its name from nearby Simpson Creek.

References

Unincorporated communities in Taylor County, West Virginia
Unincorporated communities in West Virginia
Clarksburg micropolitan area